Alma-Arasan mineral springs are located in Alma-Arasan village in the Alma-Arasan Gorge in the south part of Bostandyq district of Almaty city, Kazakhstan.

History 
Alma-Arasan mineral springs were discovered in 1931 on the slopes of the Passage River.

In November 2019, repair and renovation work was completed to improve the spring area. New stairs and a walkout playground were built. Three small swimming pools were installed. Two of them are filled with warm mineral water, one is from the river. A small house is used for swimming in the wintertime and protection from wind and rain.

Description 
In terms of composition and therapeutic properties springs refer to the siliceous thermal waters. The water contains biologically active components (mg/L): silicon dioxide (40-75), fluorine (3.6-6), hydrogen sulfide (0.58), radon (9-13 eman).

References 

Springs of Kazakhstan
Geography of Almaty